Knave of Diamonds (Romanized: Bubnovyi Valet), also called Jack Of Diamonds, was a circle of avant-garde artists in Russia, heavily influenced by French styles, who sought "to unite the stylistic system of Cezanne with the primitive traditions of folk art, the Russian lubok (popular prints) and tradesman's signs." Named for the eponymous exhibition held in Moscow in 1910, the group's intention was to provoke the art establishment in Russia, challenge "good taste," and shock. The group remained active until December 1917.

Inception: The Knave of Diamonds Exhibition, Moscow, 1910 

The Knave of Diamonds exhibition opened in Moscow in the Salon of the Levisson Building on 10 December 1910, and ran through to January 16, 1911, and included works by thirty eight artists.

The exhibition featured French cubist paintings by Henri Le Fauconnier, André Lhote, Albert Gleizes and Jean Metzinger. Curated by Alexandre Mercereau, the exhibition additionally included works by German expressionist Gabrielle Munter, Wassily Kandinsky and Alexey von Jawlensky (Russian painters then living abroad), and Russian artists active in the Moscow scene, including the group of young artists recently expelled from the Moscow School of Painting, Sculpture and Architecture due to their "leftist tendencies".

A stated objective of the exhibition was "to offer young Russian artists who find it extremely difficult to get accepted for exhibitions under the existing indolence and cliquishness of our artistic spheres, the chance to get onto the main road."

But exhibition's name itself, coined by Mikhail Larionov because "he liked the sound of it." was itself a salvo at the exhibition-attending public of the period. While one contemporary account  blandly concluded: "Organizers regard the title Knave of Diamonds as a symbol of young enthusiasm and passion, 'for the knave implies youth and the suit of diamonds represents seething blood,'" the public itself understood the symbolism to trend in a different direction: "unaccustomed to such novel titles," they assumed the show to be "a gambling house or brothel," and "in no way an art exhibition." The reviews that followed were commensurately critical.

The Moscow painters, admirers of modern French artistic styles and frequent visitors to collector Sergei Shchukin's house (from 1909, open every afternoon Sunday for public viewing) and including canvases by Cézanne, Van Gogh, Gauguin and Matisse, included Robert Falk, Natalya Goncharova, Pyotr Konchalovsky, Aleksandr Kuprin, Mikhail Larionov, Aristarkh Lentulov, Ilya Mashkov, Vasily Rozhdestvensky, and Marianna Wladimirowna Werewkina.

Kazimir Malevich also participated.

Membership Growth
The group included David Burliuk, Wladimir Burliuk, Vasily Kamensky, Velimir Khlebnikov, Aleksey Kruchenykh, Vladimir Mayakovsky, Antonina Fedorovna Sofronova, Adolf Milman, Alexander Osmerkin, Lyubov Popova, and Moisey Feigin.  Their works demonstrate the artists’ interest in the developing of the new styles (Russian Primitivism, Russian Cezanneism, Moscow School of Neo-Primitivism, among others) that emerged around their first exhibition as a result of their integrating folk art of the provinces in the artworks. Other new styles and genres, such as performance and body-art, emerged from this unlikely blending of fine European art, Russian folk art, and urban folk of the masses in Russia. The artistic significance of the individual members of The Knave of Diamonds aside, their activities conditioned a qualitative shift in Russian art of the 1910s. Among the most important changes was the democratization of the art society in Russia.

Moscow's Fractious Avante-Garde 
The show's title was subsequently adopted to form a new artistic association in Moscow, an association which soon became the largest and one of the most significant exhibition societies. This group of artists contended that Moscow would be the future of the contemporary art scene, with its artists revitalizing depleted Western European culture with the purity and vitality of their work. With a nod to Dadaist ideas, the group as a whole paid close attention to traditionally crafted toys, indigenous art forms, signboards, and even icons. The lubok print style was exalted, and folklore motifs embraced.  "The Russian artists  were following the paths that Gauguin, Matisse and Picasso had gone down in discovering the primitives of Africa and Oceania,  with the only difference that they did not need to go far away to find  inspiration but got it at home - in shop signs, in tin-ware or the works of  other non-professional folk artisans."

In 1912, the more radical members of the group, including Larionov, split to form the Donkey's Tail.

Exhibitions
 Vstavka proizvedenii khudozhnikov gruppy 'Bubnovyi valet' [Knave of Diamond Retrospective (1927)] Moscow
 Knave of Diamonds (21 Nov — 3 Dec 1917) Kira Mikhailova Art Salon, Bolshaya Dmitrovka Street, Moscow
 Knave of Diamonds (6 Nov — 19 Dec1916) Kira Mikhailova Art Salon, Bolshaya Dmitrovka Street, Moscow
 Artists of Moscow for Victims of the War (6 Dec 1915 — 18 Jan 1916)
 Knave of Diamonds (5 Feb — 2 Mar 1914) Society of Lovers of Art, Moscow
 Knave of Diamonds (7 Feb — 7 Mar 1913) Levisson house, Bolshaya Dmitrovka Street, Moscow, 3 – 28 April, St. Petersburg
 Knave of Diamonds (23 (or 25) Jan — 26 Feb 1912) Moscow Military District Economic Society of Officers, 10 Vozdvizhenko, Moscow
 Knave of Diamonds (10 Dec 1910 — 16 Jan 1911) Levisson house, Bolshaya Dmitrovka Street, Moscow

Influences
The Jack of Diamonds defined "the Russian pre-revolutionary culture", a favorite culture of the Moscow intelligentsia in the 1970s.

Related artist groups
Painters Mikhail Larionov, Natalia Goncharova, and a sub-group of artists ceded from the group to form the more radical Donkey's Tail, accusing the Knaves of artistic stagnation. Goncharova called out what she saw as the group's replacement of "artistic creation with theorizing."  Despite these period claims, in retrospect, "it is hard to award primacy and originality of pictorial enterprise" to either group.

References

Further reading
G. G. Pospelov, Bubnovii Valet / Knave of Diamonds, Moscow, 1990.
 State Russian Museum, State Tretiakov Gallery, Ekaterina Cultural Foundation, The Knave of Diamonds in the Russian Avant-Garde. St. Petersburg: Palace Editions, 2004.
 Benedikt Livshits, The One and a Half-Eyed Archer (1931). Translated by John E. Bowlt. Newtonville, Mass: Oriental Research Partners, 1977, pages 69–96.

External links

 Knave of Diamonds, InCoRM (International Chamber of Russian Modernism), Compiled by Patricia Railing

Russian artist groups and collectives
Modern artists
Russian avant-garde
Russian painters
Russian art movements
Russian Futurist painters